Filipino singer and actress Lea Salonga has released nine studio albums, three live recordings, and is involved in at least ten cast recordings. She has scored two Top 10 albums on Billboard's Classical Crossover Albums chart.  

She is best known for her roles in musical theatre, for supplying the singing voices of two Disney Princesses, and as a recording artist and television performer. Shortly after starring as the title role in the Repertory Philippines production of Annie in 1980, 9-year-old Salonga released her debut singles, "Alphabet Song ('A' You're Adorable)" and "Thank You For The Music." In the same year, she went on to release two additional singles, "Someone's Waiting For You" and "Rainbow Connection."

Albums

Studio albums

Live albums

Compilation albums

Soundtracks

Cast recordings

Extended plays

Singles

As lead artist

Promotional singles

Other appearances

Notes

References

External links
 Official website
 Lea Salonga at Spotify
 Lea Salonga at Apple Music
 Lea Salonga at YouTube Music
 Lea Salonga at Billboard
 Lea Salonga discography at AllMusic
 Lea Salonga discography at Discogs
 Lea Salonga discography at MusicBrainz

Discograpy
Discographies of Filipino artists
Pop music discographies